Maason Smith (born October 13, 2002) is an American football defensive tackle for the LSU Tigers.

High school career 
Smith attended Terrebonne High School in Houma, Louisiana. Smith was one of the top rated recruits in the 2021 class, recording more than 40 tackles and nine sacks in his senior season. As a result, Smith would be named to the All-American Bowl roster. Rated as the highest recruit in Louisiana, Smith decided to stay in state and play college football at Louisiana State University over offers from Miami, Georgia, and Alabama.

College career 
At LSU, Smith became the first player to wear the number zero in school history. In his freshman year, Smith would tally 19 tackles, four sacks, and five tackles for loss. Three of Smith's sacks would come against McNeese State. Smith would suffer a leg injury and miss the rest of the season. Smith was named to the All-SEC Freshman Team and the Freshman All-America Team. To open the 2022 season, LSU played Florida State in the Louisiana Kickoff. During the game, while celebrating a play, Smith tore his ACL prematurely ending his season.

References

External links 

 LSU Tigers bio

Living people
LSU Tigers football players
2002 births
People from Houma, Louisiana
Sportspeople from Louisiana
Players of American football from Louisiana
American football defensive tackles
Terrebonne High School alumni